Ellsworth is a village in and the county seat of Pierce County, Wisconsin, United States. The population was 3,348 at the 2020 census. The village is adjacent to the Town of Ellsworth and now incorporates the formerly separate  district known as East Ellsworth. The municipality of Ellsworth and its surroundings are slowly becoming incorporated into the Twin Cities Metro Area.

History

Settlement in the area that now comprises the village of Ellsworth began with the arrival of several families in 1857. The village was officially platted in 1862, then incorporated in 1887.  The village was initially called Perry, in honor of the War of 1812 hero, Oliver Hazard Perry, but was renamed in 1866 in honor of Col. Elmer E. Ellsworth, the first  Union officer to die in the  Civil War. A close friend of Pres. Abraham Lincoln, Ellsworth died while removing a highly visible Confederate flag from the roof of a hotel overlooking the Potomac River in Alexandria, Virginia.  The incident received national attention, and at least one other town, Ellsworth, Michigan, was named in his honor.

Downtown Ellsworth's location atop a steep hill is the result of an 1861 dispute between Pierce County's two major towns,  Prescott and  River Falls, over which should be county seat. The compromise reached was to draw lines on a map connecting the corners of the county, northwest to southeast and northeast to southwest. The intersection of these lines at a densely forested site at the top of a ridge determined the placement of the new town.  A log building was hastily erected to serve as a courthouse, then replaced by a wood-frame structure about two years later. The current Pierce County Courthouse, built 1905, was designed by the noted  St. Paul firm of Buechner & Orth. The structure exhibits characteristics of both the  neoclassical and  Beaux-Arts styles, topped by a large dome above a five-story hexagonal rotunda.

Geography
Ellsworth is located at  (44.73261, -92.480177).

Demographics

2020 census
As of the census of 2020, the population was 3,348. The racial makeup of the village was 93.2% White, 0.7% Black or African American, 0.4% Native American, 0.1% Asian, 1.1% from other races, and 4.5% from two or more races. Ethnically, the population was 3.0% Hispanic or Latino of any race.

2010 census
As of the census of 2010, there were 3,284 people, 1,331 households, and 827 families residing in the village. The racial makeup of the village was 96.6% White, 0.3% African American, 0.3% Native American, 0.4% Asian, 0.8% from other races, and 1.6% from two or more races. Hispanic or Latino of any race were 1.5% of the population.

There were 1,331 households, of which 34.5% had children under the age of 18 living with them, 44.9% were married couples living together, 12.1% had a female householder with no husband present, 5.1% had a male householder with no wife present, and 37.9% were non-families. 31.6% of all households were made up of individuals, and 13.2% had someone living alone who was 65 years of age or older. The average household size was 2.39 and the average family size was 2.98.

The median age in the village was 35.7 years. 26.2% of residents were under the age of 18; 7.9% were between the ages of 18 and 24; 27.8% were from 25 to 44; 23.7% were from 45 to 64; and 14.5% were 65 years of age or older. The gender makeup of the village was 49.0% male and 51.0% female.

2000 income statistics
As of 2000 the median income for a household in the village was $42,604, and the median income for a family was $51,286. Males had a median income of $36,069 versus $25,000 for females. The per capita income for the village was $18,661. About 2.6% of families and 5.4% of the population were below the poverty line, including 4.4% of those under age 18 and 7.9% of those age 65 or over.

East Ellsworth

The steep grades approaching Ellsworth's hilltop location proved an insurmountable challenge to railroad construction. When the Chicago, St. Paul, Minneapolis and Omaha Railway ("Omaha Road") surveyed a branch line to the locale in 1885, it bypassed the village and constructed a depot about one mile away at the foot of the grade.  The businesses that grew up by the station coalesced into the independent village of East Ellsworth. Although they are now administered as one municipal entity, Ellsworth and East Ellsworth retain separate ZIP codes.  The Isabelle River runs through East Ellsworth.

Economy
Ellsworth Cooperative Creamery

Cheese Curd Festival
Ellsworth is known as the cheese curd capital of Wisconsin, due to the cheese curds produced by its namesake creamery. The last weekend in June is reserved for a town festival which celebrates the cheese curd.

Notable people
Leon D. Case, former Michigan Secretary of State, was born in Ellsworth.
William Walter Clark, former member of the Wisconsin State Assembly and Wisconsin State Senate, attended school in Ellsworth.
Charles H. Crownhart, former Justice of the Wisconsin Supreme Court, practiced law in Ellsworth.
Franklin L. Gilson, Wisconsin State Assembly and jurist, practiced law in Ellsworth.
George Thompson, former Attorney General of Wisconsin, was born in Ellsworth.
Hans Warner, Wisconsin Secretary of State and Wisconsin State Senator, lived in Ellsworth.
Dempster Woodworth, Wisconsin State Senator and physician, lived in Ellsworth.

References

External links

Ellsworth, Wisconsin
Ellsworth Chamber of Commerce
Sanborn fire insurance maps: 1894 1900 1912

Villages in Pierce County, Wisconsin
Villages in Wisconsin
County seats in Wisconsin